The 1882–83 season was Morton Football Club's sixth season in which they competed at a national level, entering the Scottish Cup.

Fixtures and results

Scottish Cup

Renfrewshire Cup

1. Both teams qualified.
2. Thornliebank protested that Morton fielded an ineligible player. This was upheld and a replay was ordered.
3. Thornliebank protested about the poor light conditions. This was upheld and another replay was ordered.
4. Morton protested about one of the goals and that full time was called too early. The replay was arranged at a neutral venue.

Greenock & District Charity Cup

5. Southern protested about one of Morton's goals. This was dismissed and a replay was ordered. Southern refused so the cup was awarded to Morton.

Friendlies

References

External links
Greenock Morton FC official site

Greenock Morton F.C. seasons
Morton